Torquigener tuberculiferus, the fringe-gilled toadfish, is a fish of the pufferfish family Tetraodontidae native to the waters around Indonesia.

References

External links
 Fishes of Australia : Torquigener tuberculiferus

tuberculiferus
Fish of Indonesia
Marine fish of Northern Australia
fringe-gill toadfish